Jon Hamm is an American actor known for his performances in film and television.

Hamm gained worldwide acclaim and recognition for his starring role of Don Draper in the AMC drama series Mad Men (2007–2015). Hamm has also appeared in the Sky Arts series A Young Doctor's Notebook (2012–2013) alongside Daniel Radcliffe and guest starred in Channel 4 dystopian anthology series Black Mirror (2014) and the Amazon Prime fantasy series Good Omens (2019). Hamm is also known for his comedic roles in various sitcoms including his guest starring roles in 30 Rock, Unbreakable Kimmy Schmidt, Parks and Recreation, Curb Your Enthusiasm and Wet Hot American Summer: First Day of Camp. He has also hosted and appeared on Saturday Night Live.

He is also known for his film performances in Ben Affleck's crime thriller The Town (2010), the Paul Feig comedy Bridesmaids (2011), the romantic ensemble Friends with Kids (2012), the sports drama Million Dollar Arm (2014), the action comedy Keeping Up with the Joneses (2015), and Edgar Wright's action film Baby Driver (2017). He followed these by starring in the political thriller Beirut, the comedy Tag, and the thriller Bad Times at the El Royale (all 2018). He then starred in the political drama The Report, the space drama Lucy in the Sky, and Clint Eastwood's drama Richard Jewell (all 2019).

Filmography

Film

Television

Music videos

Audiobooks

Podcasts

References 

Male actor filmographies
American filmographies